Zoe Jones (formerly Wood and Wilkinson; born 14 January 1980) is a retired British figure skater. She is a two-time British national champion (2000, 2001) in ladies' singles. She reached the free skate at three ISU Championships and qualified for the 1998 Winter Olympics, but could not compete because of injury. As a pairs skater with Christopher Boyadji, she is a four-time national champion (2017–2020).

Personal life
Zoe Jones was born on 14 January 1980 in Swindon, England. She was raised in Freshbrook. She is divorced from Dody Wood and now married to Matthew Wilkinson. She is the mother of twin girls, Zarah and Zinia, born in 2007, and a boy, Zkai, born  2012. She lived in Canada for almost ten years before returning to England. She used the surname Wood until 2015, then Wilkinson before returning to Jones by December 2016.

Career

Single skating 
Jones began skating at age five at the Link Centre in Swindon. Early in her career, she was coached by Lesley Norfolk-Pearce.

In late 1995, Jones represented the U.K. at the 1996 World Junior Championships in Brisbane, Australia, and reached the final segment by placing 10th in qualifying group A and then 19th in the short program. She finished 22nd in the free skate and overall. In late 1996, she appeared at the 1997 World Junior Championships in Seoul, South Korea. She placed 20th in the short, 17th in the free, and 18th overall. She was less successful at the 1997 World Championships in Lausanne, Switzerland, being eliminated after placing 18th in qualifying group B.

In October 1997, Jones competed at the Karl Schäfer Memorial, the final opportunity to qualify for the 1998 Winter Olympics in Nagano, Japan. By finishing 6th, she earned an Olympic spot for the U.K., however, the British Olympic Association had additional requirements – a certain number of triple jumps at the British Championships. Jones sustained a torn hamstring a week before nationals and spent a year recovering.

In the 2000–01 season, Jones won the first of two national titles and was sent to the European Championships, held in January 2001 in Bratislava, Slovakia. Making the final segment at an ISU Championship for the third time in her career, she placed 7th in qualifying group A, 17th in the short, 19th in the free, and 17th overall. In March 2001, she competed at the World Championships in Vancouver, Canada but was eliminated after placing 16th in her qualifying group. She trained under Joy Sutcliffe in Ayr.

The following season, Jones had four falls at the British Championships. Weak performances from other skaters allowed her to hold on to her title but a NISA official said it was unlikely that they would send her to Europeans or Worlds. Jones retired from competition after that season and became a coach, working in Canada for almost ten years.

In 2014, she competed at the ISU Adult Figure Skating Competition and finished with two first places in Masters (Elite) Ladies I Artistic and Free Skating with the highest ever score in the Free of 71.33 points. In 2015, she repeated her success at the Adult Figure Skating Competition and competed for the last time as Zoe Wood. In December 2015, at age 35, she competed in the British Championships as Zoe Wilkinson; she won the free skate and came in second overall, missing first place by only 0.09, and in fact, had been declared the winner until an error was realized.

Pair skating 
Jones and Christopher Boyadji agreed to form a pair skating partnership following a tryout in April 2016. They trained at the Better Link Centre in Swindon. Their first competition was the 2016 CS Ondrej Nepela Memorial, where they finished 6th. With the beginning of 2017 she competed again under her birth name Jones.

The pair retired after the 2021–22 figure skating season after having a career-best 10th-place finish at the 2022 World Figure Skating Championships.

Programs

With Boyadji

Single skating

Results
GP: Grand Prix; CS: Challenger Series

With Boyadji

Single skating

References

External links
 
 

1980 births
British female single skaters
British female pair skaters
Living people
Sportspeople from Swindon